God of War (lit. "Soldier") is a 2012 South Korean television series starring Kim Joo-hyuk as the real-life historical figure Kim Jun who was written about in the Goryeosa. It aired on MBC from February 11 to September 15, 2012, on Saturdays and Sundays at 20:40 for 56 episodes.

Plot
Kim Jun is the son of an escaped palace slave, who gets raised by monks. Years later, after being torn from his home during wartime, Kim Jun must renounce his pacifist ways to partake in a deadly game that could be his ticket to freedom from his masters, Choe Chung-heon's clan. During the Mongol invasions of Korea, Kim Jun rises in the ranks to become the top military official, and eventually rules the Goryeo empire for 60 years in place of its king.

Cast

Kim Joo-hyuk as Kim Jun
Kim Gyu-ri as Choe Song-yi
Jeong Bo-seok as Choe Woo
Park Sang-min as Choe Yang-baek 
Joo Hyun as Choe Chung-heon
Lee Joo-hyun as Kim Yak-seon
Hong Ah-reum as Wol-ah/An-shim
Kang Shin-il as Monk Soo-beop
Park Sang-wook as Lee Gong-ju
Jung Sung-mo as Choe Hyang
Baek Do-bin as Choe Hang
Kim Seo-ra as Choe Woo's first wife
Jung Ho-bin as General Song Gil-yoo
Kim Young-pil as General Park Song-bi
Noh Young-guk as General Daejib Sung
Chun Ho-jin as Lee Gyu-bo
Ahn Byung-kyung as Kim Deok-myung
Kim Cheol-ki as General Kim Kyung-son 
Park Hae-soo as Kim Yun-hu
O Yeong-su as Monk Soogi 
Park Dong-bin as Hong-ji
Ahn Jae-mo as Im Yeon
Jin Seon-kyu as Gab-yi
Kim Hyuk as Man-jong
Kim Yoo-mi as Choe Woo's second wife
Lee Seok-joon as Lee Jang-yong
Lee Seung-hyo as King Gojong
Im Jong-yoon as General Choe Choon-myung
Kim Jung-hak as Monk Jin-pyo
Kim Ha-eun as Choon-shim
Choi Jae-ho as General Ryu Song-jeol
Yun Cheol-Hyeong as General Choe Jun-mun
Jo Eun-sook as Gan-nan of Tobang kitchen
Go Soo-hee as Nan-jang of Tobang kitchen
Yoo Na-young as Yeon-shim
Yoon Dong-hwan as General Tanku of the Mongol Empire
Kim Joo-young as General Lee Won-jeong of Cheolju fortress
Lee Dong-shin as Commander-in-chief Sartai of the Mongol Empire's troops (1st and 2nd invasion)
Kim Myeong-Kuk as Kublai Khan
Choi Deok-moon as General Lee Hee-juk of Cheolju fortress
Choi Soo-rin as Lee Hee-juk's wife
Kwon Tae-won as General Park Seo of Kwiju fortress 
Kim Yong-woon as Gu-pil
Jo Sang-gu as General Putau of the Mongol Empire
Baek Won-kil as Kyun-ga
Seo Kwang as Woo-ga
Choi Min as Kang Woo-moon
Jung Sun-il as General Joo-sook
Choi Kyu-hwan as Yoo-jung
Ha Soo-ho as Hwangbo Joon-chang
Jang Tae-sung as Won-bal
Kim Yun-tae as Amoogan
Seung-kyu as Kim Hong-chee
Bae Jin-sub as General Oh Seung-jeok
Lee Seung-hyung as Ryu Neung
Jeon No-min as General Moon Dae (cameo)
Lee Hee-jin as Nan-yi (cameo)

Awards and nominations

International broadcast
It aired in Thailand on Channel 5 from April 21 to December 30, 2015.

References

External links
 God of War official MBC website 
 God of War at MBC Global Media
 
 

2012 South Korean television series debuts
2012 South Korean television series endings
MBC TV television dramas
South Korean historical television series
South Korean action television series
Television series set in Goryeo
Television series set in the 13th century